Michel De Groote (born 18 October 1955) is a Belgian retired football defender. During his club career, De Groote played for RSC Anderlecht, RFC de Liège, KAA Gent and KFC Avenir Lembeek. He also gained 4 caps for the Belgium national team.

Honours

Player 

Anderlecht

 Belgian First Division: 1980–81, 1984–85, 1985–86, 1986–87
 Belgian Cup: 1975-76, 1987–88, 1988–89
 Belgian Supercup: 1985, 1987
 European Cup Winners' Cup: 1975–76 (winners), 1976-77 (runners-up)
 European Super Cup: 1976
 UEFA Cup: 1982–83 (winners), 1983-84 (runners-up)
 Amsterdam Tournament: 1976
 Jules Pappaert Cup: 1977, 1983, 1985
 Bruges Matins: 1985, 1988

References

External links
 
 

1955 births
Living people
Belgian footballers
Belgium international footballers
Association football defenders
R.S.C. Anderlecht players
UEFA Cup winning players